Penna in Teverina is a comune (municipality) in the Province of Terni in the Italian region Umbria, located about 70 km south of Perugia and about 25 km southwest of Terni.

References

Cities and towns in Umbria